Cyril Joseph Zimmer (21 April 1896 – 17 July 1951) was an Australian rules footballer who played with Fitzroy in the Victorian Football League (VFL).

Family
The son of Ernest William Zimmer (1857-1951), and Mary Anne Zimmer (1859-1910), née Bolger,  Cyril Joseph Zimmer was born at Geelong on 21 April 1896.

He married Stella Marjorie Hanns (1902-1987) in 1922.

Football
He kicked one goal in his single game at senior level.

Death
He died at West Preston, Victoria on 17 July 1951.

Notes

References
 Holmesby, Russell & Main, Jim (2007). The Encyclopedia of AFL Footballers. 7th ed. Melbourne: Bas Publishing.

External links
 
 

1896 births
1951 deaths
Australian rules footballers from Geelong
Fitzroy Football Club players